Al-Najma Club is a Bahraini multi-sports club based in Manama. The club has departments of football, handball, volleyball and basketball. The club's football section competes in the Bahraini Premier League.

Partners and & Sponsors
Bahrain Sports TV
STC Bahrain
Diyar Al Muharraq
Kuwait Finance House
Cryo Temp Recovery
Kuwait Finance House
National of Bahrain Bank
Bank Muscat
Al Fardan Exchange
Saudi National Bank
Etisalat by e&
Batelco
Furata Water
Gulf Air
Bahrain International Airport
Visit Bahrain
Bahrain Olympic Committee
Ministry of Youth and Sport Affairs
Origami Media
Fareed Aluminium Center
Erima Sport
Solo Sport

History
Al-Najma Club were amalgamated together with Al Wahda, which won the Bahraini King's Cup in 1988, 1992 and 1994, and Al-Arabi, which won the Bahraini King's Cup in 1969 and the 1974–75 Bahraini Premier League; then with Al-Hilal, Al-Qadisiya, which played the Bahraini King's Cup final in 2000, and Ras Al-Rumman in 2002.

Achievements

Football
Bahraini Premier League: 1
 1974–1975
Bahraini King's Cup: 7
 1969, 1988, 1992, 1994, 2006, 2007, 2018
Bahraini Super Cup: 2
 2007, 2008

Performance in AFC competitions
AFC Cup: 2 appearances
2008: Group Stage
2019: Group Stage

Performance in UAFA Competitions
Gulf Club Champions Cup: 1 appearance
 2008: Group Stage

Continental record

Rivalries
Al-Ahli Club is considered to be Al Najma's fiercest rival. The two teams contest the derby called The Capital's Derby. Both teams are considered to be the most decorated in the capital city. However, Al Najma fans are also known to have friendly relations towards Muharraq fans. Sometimes Al Najma fans could be spotted attending Muharraq matches and vice versa, when their own club is no longer in contention for the title.

Partners and & Sponsors
Bahrain Sports TV
STC Bahrain
Diyar Al Muharraq
Kuwait Finance House
Cryo Temp Recovery
Kuwait Finance House
National of Bahrain Bank
Bank Muscat
Al Fardan Exchange
Saudi National Bank
Etisalat by e&
Batelco
Furata Water
Gulf Air
Bahrain International Airport
Visit Bahrain
Bahrain Olympic Committee
Ministry of Youth and Sport Affairs
Origami Media
Fareed Aluminium Center
Erima Sport
Solo Sport

Asian Men's Club League Handball Championship

Current squad
Squad for the 22nd HH Emir Asia Cup The country's redeemer Handball Championship for Men's - Dammam and Dubai, sports season 2022-2023, during the period from 14-26 March 2023 p.

Head coach: Ali Sayed Al-Falahi

References 

Handball clubs in Bahrain
1946 establishments in Bahrain